Heinz Tietjen (24 June 1881 – 30 November 1967) was a German conductor and music producer born in Tangier, Morocco.

Biography 
Tietjen was born in Tangier, Morocco. At age twenty-three, he held the position of producer at the Opera House in Trier and was appointed its director in 1907, holding the dual roles until 1922. Simultaneously, he was the director at Saarbrücken and Breslau (now Wrocław, Poland) from 1919 to 1922.

Tietjen was the director of the Deutsche Oper Berlin between 1925 and 1927, then director of the Prussian State Theatre. Among his productions at this time was the Berlin premiere of Hans Gál's 1923 opera, Die heilige Ente. From 1931 to 1944, Tietjen served as artistic director at the Bayreuth Festspielhaus for Winifred Wagner with whom he had a romantic liaison.

In 1948 he returned to direct the Deutsche Oper Berlin, serving until 1955 when he was appointed manager and artistic director of the new Hamburg State Opera, a job he held until 1959.

Heinz Tietjen died in 1967 in Baden-Baden.

References

1881 births
1967 deaths
20th-century German people
20th-century German conductors (music)
German male conductors (music)
General directors of the Berlin State Opera
People from Tangier
Knights Commander of the Order of Merit of the Federal Republic of Germany
20th-century German male musicians
German expatriates in Morocco